Yılmaz Argüden is a Turkish strategist, governance expert, and author. He is the founder and chairman of ARGE Consulting, an Istanbul-based management consulting firm. He is also the Chairman of the Turkish office of Rothschild & Co. Argüden has served as the Chairman of Governance Committee of Business at OECD, Chairman of UN Global Compact Local Networks, and as the vice-chair of the Turkish Basketball Federation.

Education 
Argüden received his Bachelors of Science degree in Industrial engineering from the Boğaziçi University with top Academic Achievement Award and Rector's Prize for student leadership. He received his PhD in policy analysis from the Frederick S. Pardee RAND Graduate School.

Career 
Argüden started his career in Koç Holding in 1977. From 1980 to 1985, he worked as a policy analyst for RAND Corporation. He has worked at the World Bank as a senior officer between 1985 and 1988 before returning to Ankara upon Turkish government's invitation. In 1991, he served as the Chief Economic Advisor to the Prime Minister Mesut Yılmaz. In the same year, he founded ARGE Consulting. He served as an independent director on over 70 boards in different countries and as the Chairman of Erdemir (1997-99).

In 2005, Argüden was initially selected as the Senior Advisor of Rothschild & Co investment bank. In 2006, he became the Country Representative of Rothschild, and in 2007, he was appointed as the Chairman of the Turkish office of Rothschild & Co. Argüden served as the Chairman of the Governance Committee of the Business at OECD and as a member of the IFC’s Corporate Governance Advisory Board. He is also the Chairman of the Trustees of the Argüden Governance Academy and has authored numerous books, articles, and columns focusing on business, strategy, and governance issues. 

He initiated the National Quality Movement in 1998 as the chairman of National Quality Association, KalDer, and served on the board of UN Global Compact as the elected Chair of Local Networks between 2013 and 2015.

Argüden was named a Global Leader for Tomorrow by the World Economic Forum (1999), received the Distinguished Citizenship Award for his efforts in the development of Turkish-American relations (2008), and the Distinguished Industry Leadership Award from the International Industrial Engineering Society (IEOM) (2022).

Selected Publications

References 

Living people
Turkish academics
Tarsus American College alumni
Turkish economists
Year of birth missing (living people)